Maria Schmidt Lykkegaard (born 27 February 1996) is a Danish handball player who plays for København Håndbold and the Danish national team.

She also represented Denmark in the 2016 Women's Junior World Handball Championship and in the 2015 Women's U-19 European Handball Championship, receiving gold both times.

She made her debut on the Danish national team on 28 September 2018.

Achievements 
Danish Championship:
Winner: 2018
Silver Medalist: 2017

References

1996 births
Living people
Danish female handball players
Handball players from Copenhagen